The 2022 term of the Supreme Court of the United States began October 3, 2022, and will conclude October 1, 2023. The table below illustrates which opinion was filed by each justice in each case and which justices joined each opinion.

Table key

2022 term opinions

2022 term membership and statistics
This is the eighteenth term of Chief Justice Roberts's tenure and the first term for Justice Jackson.

Notes

References

 
 

Lists of United States Supreme Court opinions by term